Godman's long-tailed bat (Choeroniscus godmani) is a species of bat in the family Phyllostomidae. It is found in Colombia, Costa Rica, El Salvador, Guatemala, Guyana, Honduras, Mexico, Nicaragua, Suriname, and Venezuela.

References

Choeroniscus
Mammals of Colombia
Mammals described in 1903
Taxonomy articles created by Polbot
Taxa named by Oldfield Thomas
Bats of Central America
Bats of South America